In Greek mythology, Centaurus is the father of the race of mythological beasts known as the centaurs or Ixionidae. The Centaurs are half-man, half horse; having the torso of a man extending where the neck of a horse should be. They were said to be wild, savage, and lustful.

Mythology
After Ixion, king of the Lapiths, fell into insanity and was ostracized by his people, Zeus sympathized greatly with Ixion and brought him up to Olympus to dine with the gods. There Ixion saw Hera, Zeus' wife and queen of the gods, with whom he fell instantly in love and began to desire her sexually. Zeus, suspicious of Ixion, set for him a trap by fashioning a figure from cloud (Nephele) in the likeness of Hera and laying it next to Ixion whilst he was asleep in a field. When Ixion awoke, he began to make love to Hera's double, which so enraged Zeus that he drove Ixion from Mount Olympus, struck him with a thunderbolt, and damned Ixion to be eternally bound to a flying burning wheel that would spin around the heavens nonstop (though it was later moved to Tartarus).

Nephele's child by this union was Centaurus, a deformed child who hunched over and found no peace amongst other humans, and so removed to the mountain of Pelion. There, he roamed, lived, and mated with the Magnesian mares who resided there. This resulted in the birth of the centaur race.

Constellation

Centaurus was the first person to group stars into constellations and taught others how to read them. One explanation of the constellation is that Centaurus put a picture of himself in the sky to guide his sailor friends the Argonauts.

The most popular meaning of the constellation is that it represents the form of Chiron. Chiron was the king of the centaurs and unlike his race he was intelligent and wise. So wise, in fact, that he tutored Heracles who became one of his great friends. The myth goes that Heracles was out on a visit to his dear friend Pholus' house. Pholus was a centaur and was having dinner with Heracles. After dinner was over Heracles decided that he was thirsty and took it upon himself to get some wine. The wine that he took, however, was the sacred wine of the centaurs. It was meant to only be drunk by the centaurs and only on special occasions. Pholus saw this and could not muster up the courage to tell his strong friend that he was not allowed to drink that wine. It was not long before the sacred scent reached the other centaurs. The infuriated centaurs grabbed weapons and charged at Pholus' house. The coward Pholus fled almost immediately and left Heracles to fend for himself. Heracles killed several of the centaurs and soon enough of them were dead that the rest became afraid and tried to flee. Upon shooting at the fleeing beasts, Heracles' poison arrow grazed the knee of Chiron. Chiron was not involved in the fight but came out to try to stop it. The immortal Chiron could not die from his wound and thus would be doomed to live in great pain forever. He cried to Zeus to give him relief and end his life. Zeus took pity on the centaur and let him die. To honor him, Zeus gave Chiron a place amongst the stars.

References
 Kronberg, C. "Centaurus." Constellations and Maps. 17 Jan 2004. Web. 15 Nov 2009. <http://maps.seds.org/Stars_en/Fig/centaurus.html>.
 Credner, Till, and Sven Kohle. "Centaurus, Circinus." The Deep Photographic Guide to the Constellations. Web. 15 Nov 2009. <http://www.allthesky.com/constellations/centaurus/>.
 Dolan, Chris. "Centarus." Constellations. Web. 15 Nov 2009. <http://www.astro.wisc.edu/~dolan/constellations/constellations/Centaurus.html>.

Centaurs
Mythological hybrids
Horses in mythology